Mahmoud Ezzat Ibrahim (also sometimes spelled "Mahmoud Izzat"; born 13 August 1944) is the former acting general guide of the Muslim Brotherhood in Egypt and one of the most prominent leaders of the Muslim Brotherhood. Historian Fawaz Gerges describes his role as "akin to chief of staff of the Ikhwan [Muslim Brotherhood]."

Personal life
Ezzat was born on August 13, 1944, in Zagazig, Sharqia Governorate. He is a member of the group's counseling office, and a professor at the Faculty of Medicine at Zagazig University. He is married to the daughter of former supreme guide Mahdi Akef and has five children with her.

Education
Finished high school in 1960.
He received his Bachelor of Medicine in 1975.
And Masters in 1980.
And Ph.D. in 1985 from Zagazig University.
Obtained a diploma from the Institute of Islamic Studies in 1998
And a license to recite Quran from the Recitation Institute in 1999.

Early Muslim Brotherhood links
He got acquainted with the Muslim Brotherhood as a boy in 1953. He enrolled in the (Brotherhood) class in 1962 and was one of the disciples of Sayyid Qutb. He was a student in the Faculty of Medicine when he was arrested in 1965. He was sentenced to ten years and was released in 1974. He was a fourth year student at the time. He completed his studies and graduated from the Faculty of Medicine in 1976, and his connection to the advocacy work in Egypt - especially with the well educated students - remained until he went to work in Sanaa University in the laboratory department in 1981, and then traveled to England to complete his doctoral thesis. He then returned to Egypt and obtained his doctorate from Zagazig University in 1985. He was chosen as a member of the Guidance Office in 1981.

Imprisonment
 He was arrested in 1965 and spent nine years in prison.
 He was arrested in May 1993 pending investigation into the Brotherhood case known as the Salsabeel case.
 In 1995, he was imprisoned for being a leader of an illegal organization.
 He was arrested on January 2, 2009, for participating in a demonstration in the center of Cairo protesting against the Israeli attack on the Gaza Strip.
 On 28 August 2020, Ezzat was arrested during an apartment raid in Cairo, and was succeeded by Ibrahim Munir as the acting general guide of the Muslim Brotherhood in Egypt.
 On 8 April 2021, he was convicted on "terror" charges, and sentenced to life in prison.

Scientific Interests
Much research and activity in the field of hospital infection resistance in Egypt and Britain.
Much research into epidemic diseases in Egypt, such as meningitis and cholera.
Advocacy interests in the field of education, students, public work, human rights, and medical charitable work.
Vice Chairman of the board of directors of the Islamic Medical Association.

Appointment as Acting Leader of the Muslim Brotherhood
After the arrest of Mohammed Badie on August 20, 2013, the Muslim Brotherhood appointed Mahmoud Ezzat as the acting guide.

Judgments in absentia

Mahmoud Ezzat was issued a number of judgments in absentia in several cases:
 On December 19, 2021, Egypt's State Security Assize Court upheld the death sentence on the former acting Muslim Brotherhood Supreme Leader. He was charged with "foreign intelligence" and "acts of terrorism and sabotage".
 The case of the “Al-Sharainah cell in Minya”: The Minya Criminal Court ruled, on 18 August 2020, that the deputy guide of Muslim Brotherhood Mahmoud Ezzat and seven others were sentenced to life imprisonment in absentia for “inciting violence and inciting riots” and possessing publications that would incite disturbing public opinion."
 Prison break case: On June 16, 2015, the Cairo Criminal Court issued a judgment in absentia to execute Mahmoud Ezzat and 92 others, accused of escaping from Wadi el-Natrun Prison after breaking out of the prison in 2011.
 The "Guidance Office Events" case: He was sentenced to life imprisonment.
 Communication case: The Criminal Court of Nasr City, in absentia, sentenced Mahmoud Ezzat to death for accusing him of communicating with Hamas.

See also
 Hassan al-Banna
 Hassan al-Hudaybi
 Mohammed Mahdi Akef
 Khairat el-Shater
 Essam el-Erian
 Sayyid Qutb

References

External links
 الأمين العام لجماعة الإخوان المسلمين في حوارٍ صريحٍ جدًّا، إخوان أون لاين, 23 أكتوبر 2007م
 مستقبل جماعة الإخوان المسلمين, Bela Hodod, Al Jazeera, 16 December 2009

1944 births
Egyptian prisoners sentenced to life imprisonment
Egyptian Muslim Brotherhood leaders
Living people
People from Zagazig
Zagazig University alumni
Egyptian infectious disease physicians
Egyptian politicians convicted of crimes
Prisoners sentenced to life imprisonment by Egypt
20th-century Egyptian politicians
21st-century Egyptian politicians
20th-century Egyptian physicians
21st-century Egyptian physicians